The Chevet Achim Synagogue, located in Havana, is the oldest synagogue in Cuba. The building is owned and maintained by Arian Behar and Moises Prinstein.

See also
History of the Jews in Cuba

References

Synagogues in Havana
Buildings and structures in Havana